Charles Manners Lushington (27 April 181927 November 1864) was an English Conservative politician who sat in the House of Commons from 1854 to 1857.

Background and education
Lushington was born on 27April 1819 at 4 Cleveland Square, Bayswater, West London, the youngest son of Stephen Rumbold Lushington and Anne Elizabeth, . He was educated at Eton College, Oriel College, Oxford, graduating in 1843 with a MA, and later elected Fellow of All Souls College, Oxford. He served in the East Kent Yeomanry Cavalry of which he became captain in November 1853.

Political career
He was elected as a Member of Parliament (MP) for the borough of Canterbury at a by-election in August 1854, after the borough's writ of election had been suspended when a Royal Commission found that there had been extensive corruption. Lushington held the seat until the 1857 general election, which he did not contest. At the 1859 general election, he unsuccessfully contested the borough of Nottingham.

Family
On 5May 1846, Lushington married Henrietta Stafford Northcote, daughter of Sir Henry Stafford Northcote, 7th Baronet and Agnes Mary Cockburn, at Trinity Church, Marylebone. She died on 20January 1900 (aged 79) at Florence. Their daughter Agnes married Walter Phillimore, 1st Baron Phillimore in 1870.

References

External links
 

|-

1819 births
1864 deaths
Conservative Party (UK) MPs for English constituencies
UK MPs 1852–1857
Politics of Canterbury
Royal East Kent Yeomanry officers
People from Sanderstead